St. Mark's Episcopal Cathedral in Seattle, Washington, is the seat of the bishop of the Episcopal Diocese of Olympia. St. Mark's was founded as a mission church of Trinity Parish Church.

History

Plans for the building, located on the west side of 10th Avenue East between East Highland Drive and East Galer Street on Capitol Hill, were drawn up in 1926. Fundraising took place for two years until construction began in 1928. Ground was broken on September 30, 1928. The Great Depression took a toll on the parish, however. Construction was incomplete when the cathedral was dedicated on April 25, 1931, and the parish was in default on its mortgage throughout the 1930s. The cathedral was foreclosed upon in 1941 and shut for the next two years. From 1943 to 1944, the United States Army used the cathedral as an anti-aircraft training facility; the evidence of this era can still be seen in murals in the crypt.

In 1944, Bishop S. Arthur Huston reopened discussions with the parish's bankers in St. Louis, Missouri; over the next three years, more funds were raised, and in 1947 the mortgage was paid.  The mortgage document was burned before the Parish on Palm Sunday.

The cathedral's dean, Robert V. Taylor, resigned abruptly in March 2008, stating that he and the vestry (church board) diverged in their visions for the future of St. Mark's and there was a loss of trust between them.

After several years of transitional ministry, Taylor was succeeded by Steven Lynn Thomason in the summer of 2012.

Location

St. Mark's Cathedral is located at the top of a very steep drop-off to Lakeview Boulevard East below. The wooded hillside is known as the St. Mark's Greenbelt.

Organ

The choir loft of St. Mark's is home to one of the largest pipe organs in Seattle. The organ was built in 1965 by D. A. Flentrop (Zaandam, Netherlands) and restored in 1993-1994 and 2001 by Paul Fritts & Company Organ Builders, Tacoma. Further additions followed  in 1995 (new chorus reeds 16' and 8' in Manual II) and 1996 (Zymbelstern). In 2011, Paul Fritts installed new horizontal reed stops (the former horizontal trumpets from 1965 were stored). The instrument has 58 stops/79 ranks on four manuals/pedal, and contains 3,944 pipes. The current organists are Michael Kleinschmidt (Canon Musician), and John Stuntebeck (Associate Organist).

Gallery

See also 

List of the Episcopal cathedrals of the United States
List of cathedrals in the United States
 Compline Choir

References

External links

 
 St. Marks Greenbelt. Seattle Parks and Recreation. Retrieved January 25, 2018.
 Long, Priscilla (April 19, 2001). Seattle's St. Mark's Episcopal Cathedral opens in 1930. HistoryLink.org Essay 3223. Retrieved January 25, 2018.

Churches in Seattle
Mark Seattle
Capitol Hill, Seattle